Min Naiben (9 August 1935 – 16 September 2018), also known as Nai-Ben Ming, was a Chinese materials scientist, physicist, and politician. He was a Standing Committee member of the 9th Central Committee of the Jiusan Society and vice-president of the 10th and 11th Central Committee of the Jiusan Society.

Biography
Min was born in Rugao, Jiangsu, on August 9, 1935. After graduating from Shanghai Advanced Mechanical Vocational School (now University of Shanghai for Science and Technology) in 1954, he studied and then taught at Nanjing University. In 1982 he was hired as an associate visiting professor at the University of Utah. In 1986 he became a guest professor at Tohoku University. In 1986, Min was appointed as the group leader of Physics Group of the National Natural Science Foundation of China, a position in which he remained until 1992. In 1990–1991 he taught as a guest professor at the University of Alabama. He joined the Jiusan Society in 1995. He was elected an academician of the Chinese Academy of Sciences in 1991 and a fellow of The World Academy of Sciences in 2001.

On September 16, 2018, he died of an illness in Nanjing, Jiangsu.

Papers

Awards and honors 
 1999 TWAS Prize for Physics, "for design and fabrication of periodic and quasiperiodic dielectric superlattices and realization of second harmonic generation (SHG), multiple wavelength SHG, third harmonic generation, optical stability, polariton excitation, and ultrasonic generation with high frequency".
 Ho Leung Ho Lee Prize for Physics
 2006 First Prize of National Natural Science
 Asteroid 199953 Mingnaiben, discovered by the PMO NEO Survey Program in 2007, was named in his honor. The official  was published by the Minor Planet Center on 22 July 2013.

References 
 

1935 births
2018 deaths
Chinese materials scientists
Educators from Nantong
Members of the Jiusan Society
Nanjing University alumni
Academic staff of Nanjing University
Members of the Chinese Academy of Sciences
People's Republic of China politicians from Jiangsu
Physicists from Jiangsu
Politicians from Nantong
Scientists from Nantong
Tohoku University alumni
TWAS fellows
TWAS laureates
University of Shanghai for Science and Technology alumni
People from Rugao